Trégon is a former commune in the Côtes-d'Armor department of Brittany in northwestern France. On 1 January 2017, it was merged into the new commune Beaussais-sur-Mer.

Population

Inhabitants of Trégon are called trégonnais in French.

See also
 Communes of the Côtes-d'Armor department

References

External links

 

Former communes of Côtes-d'Armor